The University of Santo Tomas Graduate School is the graduate school of the University of Santo Tomas, the oldest and largest Catholic university in Manila, Philippines.

As early as the seventeenth (17th) century, the University of Santo Tomas (UST) had already been granting master's and doctoral degrees. The different faculties and colleges supervised their respective undergraduate, graduate and postgraduate programs

General information
Academic programs have grown from a handful of academic offerings to around ninety  graduate degree programs, spanning a cross-section of disciplines. Regular classes, colloquia and oral defenses are held at the Thomas Aquinas Research Complex. Laboratories and conference halls are maintained at the left wing of the Benavides Building. The UST Graduate School publishes The Antoninus Journal (formerly Ad Veritatem), a refereed multidisciplinary scholarly journal.

Academic recognition
The UST Graduate School is recognized by the Commission on Higher Education of the Philippines as a Center of Excellence in several fields of the arts and humanities, allied health sciences, natural sciences, and engineering. Its programs in business management, public management, and education were also recognized by the Commission on Higher Education's Fund for Center of Excellence also and Assistance to Private Education (FAPE) in its periodic and systemic Evaluation of Graduate Education Programs (EGEP).

Six of its business-related degrees are also included in the 2011-2017 list of top international master's programs by the Paris-based Eduniversal International Scientific Committee.  The following programs are ranked in the Far East Asian region, according to their respective categories: MA in Communication (10th place); MA in Economics (14th); MS in Human Relations Management (14th); Master of Public Administration (17th); MS in Management Engineering (39th); and MBA in Entrepreneurship program (99th).

More importantly, the Graduate School now enjoys Level III accreditation status for its Master’s programs granted by the Philippine Association of Colleges and Universities Commission on Accreditation (PACUCOA), maintains two Centers of Development (M.S./Ph.D. Psychology and M.A. Literature) and three Centers of Excellence (M.A./Ph.D. Philosophy, Master in Music and M.S./Ph.D. Chemistry) and has been recognized by EDUNIVERSAL as one of best Master’s Programs worldwide.

U.S.T. Academic Deans

1938-1941:           Rev. Fr. Silvestre Sancho, O.P., S.Th.D.
1946-1951:           Rev. Fr. Eugenio Jordan, O.P., Ph.LittD.
1952:                Rev. Fr. Jesus Castañon, O.P., Litt.D.
1952:                Rev. Fr. Antonio Gonzalez, O.P., Ph.D.
1953-1957:           Rev. Fr. Angel de Blas, O.P., Ph.D.
1858-1960:           Rev. Fr. José Cuesta, O.P., M.A.
1961-1964:           Rev. Fr. Vidal Clemente, O.P., S.Th.D.
1965-1970:           Rev. Fr. Alfredo Panizo, O.P., Ph.D.
1970-1974:           Prof. Estela Llenado-Zamora, Ph.D.
1974-1976:           Rev. Fr. Antonio Gonzalez, O.P., Ph.D.
1976-1982:           Prof. Carmen  Kanapi, Ph.D.
1982-1986:           Rev. Fr. Paul Zwaenepoel, C.I.C.M., Ph.D.
1987-1995:           Prof. Magdalena Villaba, Ph.D.
1995-1999:           Rev. Fr. José Antonio E. Aureada, O.P.
2000-2013:           Prof. Lilian J. Sison, Ph.D.
2013-present:        Prof. Marilou R. Madrunio, Ph.D.

Notable alumni
The Graduate School has produced the following alumni:

Government
Jose P. Laurel - President of the Second Philippine Republic
Arturo Tolentino - former Vice President of the Philippines
Diosdado Macapagal - former President of the Philippines
Renato Corona - former Chief Justice of the Philippine Supreme Court
Sotero Laurel - Senator of the Republic of the Philippines (1987-1992)
Claro M. Recto - Senator of the Republic of the Philippines
Maria Kalaw-Katigbak - Senator of the Republic of the Philippines (1961–67) Fifth Congress

Academe and professional practice
Merlinda Bobis - Professor, Creative Writing Program, University of Wollongong in Australia; Winner: Australian Writers’ Guild Award, Ian Reed Radio Drama Prize, International Prix Italia, Steele Rudd Award for the Best Published Collection of Australian Short Stories, Judges’ Choice Award at the Bumbershoot Bookfair in the Seattle Arts Festival, UMPIL (Union of Writers in the Philippines) Awardee
 Rustica Carpio - professor, theatre and stage actress and internationally and locally awarded film actress.
Cristina Pantoja-Hidalgo - Vice President for Public Affairs, University of the Philippines; former Dean, UP College of Arts and Letters; former Executive Director, UP Institute of Creative Writing; former Director, UP Press
William Henry Scott - Noted historian on Pre-Hispanic Philippines and Gran Cordilleria Central, Tanglaw ng Lahi Awardee
 Gregorio Zaide - professor and historian, a textbook author on Philippine and World histories, former mayor of Pagsanjan, Laguna.
Paz Latorena - teacher and fictionist, who belongs to the first generation of Filipino writers in English. Her short story, "The Small Key" is a widely anthologized literary work.
Jean Garcia - Filipina actress.
Dr. Dante Garcia - Summa Cum Laude, Statistician and Economics Professor
Joy Darilag - Reigning Summa Cum Laude, A.F.P., Human Resources Management Director or V.P.
Eduardo Torno - Magna Cum Laude, Resident Accountant I.B.M.
Dianne Claveria - Cum Laude, Librarian, Economics and Finance, Dept. Philippines Stocks Exchange
Jennifer Go - Cum Laude, Branch Manager, Security Bank

References

External links
UST Graduate School -  Official website

Educational institutions established in 1938
Graduate schools in the Philippines
Business schools in the Philippines
Graduate School
Public administration schools
Public policy schools
1938 establishments in the Philippines